"Who's Gonna Take the Garbage Out" is a song written by Johnny Tillotson and Teddy Wilburn that was originally performed by American country music artists Loretta Lynn and Ernest Tubb. It was released as a single in May 1969 via Decca Records.

Background and reception 
"Who's Gonna Take the Garbage Out" was recorded at Bradley's Barn on February 18, 1969. Located in Nashville, Tennessee, the session was produced by renowned country music producer Owen Bradley. Three additional tracks were recorded during this session.

"Who's Gonna Take the Garbage Out" reached number eighteen on the Billboard Hot Country Singles survey in 1969. It was included on their studio album, If We Put Our Heads Together (1969).

Charts

Weekly charts

References 

1969 songs
1969 singles
Decca Records singles
Loretta Lynn songs
Ernest Tubb songs
Song recordings produced by Owen Bradley
Songs written by Johnny Tillotson